is a Japanese boulderer. In 2012, she sent Catharsis, a boulder route in Shiobara established by Dai Koyamada, and confirmed by Daniel Woods, to become the first-ever woman to climb a  route. Since then, only three other women -- Ashima Shiraishi, Shauna Coxsey, and Alex Puccio—have sent problems of that level. Ogawa began climbing in 2000, at age 22. Her other notable ascents of boulders include Caramba , Mutante , Akugeki , Atomic Playboy , Hatchling , and No Late Tenders .

References

1978 births
Japanese rock climbers
Living people
Female climbers
Boulder climbers